William IV (13 November 1493 – 7 March 1550) was Duke of Bavaria from 1508 to 1550, until 1545 together with his younger brother Louis X, Duke of Bavaria.
He was born in Munich to Albert IV and Kunigunde of Austria, a daughter of Emperor Frederick III.

Political activity

Though his father had determined the everlasting succession of the firstborn prince in 1506, his younger brother Louis refused a spiritual career with the argument that he was born before the edict became valid. With support of his mother and the States-General, Louis forced William to accept him as co-regent in 1516. Louis then ruled the districts of Landshut and Straubing, in general in concord with his brother.

William initially sympathized with the Reformation but changed his mind as it grew more popular in Bavaria. In 1522 William issued the first Bavarian religion mandate, banning the promulgation of Martin Luther's works. After an agreement with Pope Clement VII in 1524 William became a political leader of the German Counter reformation, although he remained in opposition to the Habsburgs since his brother Louis X claimed the Bohemian crown. Both dukes also suppressed the peasant uprising in South Germany in an alliance with the archbishop of Salzburg in 1525.

The conflict with Habsburg ended in 1534 when both dukes reached an agreement with Ferdinand I in Linz. William then supported Charles V in his war against the Schmalkaldic League in 1546, but however did not succeed in preserving the Palatine electoral dignity. William's chancellor for 35 years was the forceful Leonhard von Eck.

Cultural activity
On 23 April 1516, before a committee consisting of gentry and knights in Ingolstadt, William issued his famous purity regulation for the brewing of Bavarian Beer, stating that only barley, hops, and water could be used.  This regulation remained in force until it was abolished as a binding obligation in 1986 by Paneuropean regulations of the European Union.

In 1523 with the appointment of Ludwig Senfl began the rise of the Bavarian State Orchestra. Of particular importance is the Eckbibel Johann Eck wrote on behalf of William, a biblical translation from 1537, which is theologically directly against Luther and therefore belongs to the Catholic correction bibles. It is also significant in terms of linguistics because it is not written in the East German Saxon, but in Bavarian Upper German.

William was a significant collector and commissioner of art.  Among other works he commissioned an important suite of paintings from various artists, including the Battle of Issus by Albrecht Altdorfer.  This, like most of William's collection, is now housed in the Alte Pinakothek in Munich. With his order to expand the Neuveste with the so-called Rundstubenbau and to set up the first Court Garden began the history of the Munich Residenz as a representative palace. To the history cycle of the garden pavilion belonged Albrecht Altdorfer's painting. In 1546, he and his son Albert V ordered the construction of Dachau Palace from a Gothic ruin into a Renaissance style four-winged palace with a court garden which later became the favored residence of the rulers of Bavaria.

William died in 1550 in Munich and was succeeded by his son Albert. He is buried in the Frauenkirche in Munich.

Family and children

In 1522 William married Jakobaea of Baden (1507–1580), a daughter of Margrave Philip I of Baden and his consort Princess Elisabeth of Palatinate; they had four children:
 
 Theodor of Bavaria (10 February 1526 – 8 July 1534)
 Duke Albert V of Bavaria (1528–1579)
 Wilhelm of Bavaria (17 February 1529 – 22 October 1530)
 Mechthild of Bavaria (12 July 1532 – 2 November 1565), married in 1557 Philibert of Baden (1536–1569)

Ancestors

External links
Hofkleiderbuch (Abbildung und Beschreibung der Hof-Livreen) des Herzogs Wilhelm IV. und Albrecht V. 1508–1551. (Court and Coat of Arms Book of Bavarian Dukes: William IV and Albert V) at the Bavarian State Library
 4 Gallican Psalter with Canticles at OPenn

William 4, Duke of Bavaria
William 4, Duke of Bavaria
16th-century dukes of Bavaria
William 4, Duke of Bavaria
William 4, Duke of Bavaria
Modern child monarchs
William 4